Katarze (in English Catharsis) is the debut studio album of the Czech pop music group Slza. The album was released on November 13, 2015 by Universal Music. The group recorded in DC Sound studio from December 2013 to October 2015 under the supervision of producer Dalibor Cídlinský. The music for the songs was composed by Cídlinský and the guitarist of the band Lukáš Bundil, the author of the lyrics is Ondřej Ládek, known under the pseudonym Xindl X. For the album, the band was nominated for three awards 2015; Group of the Year, Discover the Year and Album of the Year. At the same time, the board was well sold, in the Czech IFPI debut in the first place and in the front seats was also held throughout the year 2016. During this year, it was awarded a three-platter board.

The band released a total of three digital singles. The first one, "Lhůta záruční," was released in 2014, followed by "Celibát" on March 22, and the title song "Katarze" was released on November 13. All video clips were also recorded on all singles.

Track listing

Reception

Personnel 
 Petr Lexa – singing
 Lukáš Bundil – guitar

Other 
 Jan Cidlinský – bass guitar
 Dalibor Cidlinský – piano, keys, synthesizer
 Xindl X – composing texts

Technical support 
 Dalibor Cidlinský – production
 Ecson Waldes – mastering

References 

2017 albums
Universal Music Group albums
Czech-language albums
Slza albums